Cindy Watson (born 24 March 1978) is a retired tennis player from Australia.

Career statistics
Her highest singles ranking is world No. 131, (achieved on 28 October 2002) and her highest doubles ranking is No. 108 (reached on 8 August 2005). Watson won 13 titles on the ITF Circuit in her career: seven in singles and six in doubles. Watson has taken part in many WTA Tour events.

Biography
Her biggest career highlight is reaching the third round of the 2002 Australian Open. She defeated María José Martínez Sánchez and Emmanuelle Gagliardi in the first and second rounds, respectively, before falling to fourth seed Kim Clijsters, 1–6, 2–6 in the third round.

Watson played on two other Grand Slam tournaments- she fell in the first rounds of the 1999 Australian Open to Mary Pierce and of the 2005 Australian Open to Sania Mirza.

ITF Circuit finals

Singles: 15 (7–8)

Doubles: 14 (6–8)

References

External links
 
 

Living people
1978 births
Australian female tennis players
Place of birth missing (living people)
21st-century Australian women